A number of officially licensed video games based on the character Superman have been created, the first being released in 1979, over a year after the Superman film.

Over the years, video games based on Superman have attained a reputation for being of low quality. The most prevalent example of this is the 1999 Nintendo 64 Superman game which is considered to be one of the worst video games ever made. As a result, later Superman games were given "the Superman curse", which means that there will be negative reception for that game.

Standalone games

Related games

Mobile games

Canceled games

References

External links
 

Superman video games
Video games
Lists of video games by franchise
Superhero video games